Roy Snell may refer to:
 Roy Snell (footballer), Australian rules footballer
 Roy J. Snell, American writer